Tibor Benedek (12 July 1972 – 18 June 2020) was a Hungarian water polo player and coach, widely regarded as one of the greatest players of all time. He played on the gold medal squads at the 2000 Summer Olympics, 2004 Summer Olympics and 2008 Summer Olympics. Benedek also competed at the 1992 and 1996 Summer Olympics, where the Hungarian team  placed 6th and 4th, respectively.

Benedek was the head coach of Hungary men's national water polo team between 2013 and 2016.

Benedek was named Hungarian Water Polo Player of the Year in 1992, 1993 and 1994. He made his debut for the national side in 1990. His father, Miklós Benedek, is an actor. 

Widely regarded as one of the greatest water polo players of all time, Benedek ranks second on the all-time scoring list in Olympic history, with 65 goals. He was the joint top goalscorer at the 1992 Barcelona Olympics, with 22 goals, and the top goalscorer at the 1996 Atlanta Olympics, with 19 goals. Benedek is the ninth player to compete in water polo at five Olympics, and one of ten male athletes who won three Olympic gold medals in water polo. In 2016, he was inducted in the International Swimming Hall of Fame.

Tibor Benedek died on 18 June 2020 due to pancreatic cancer. His death was announced by the Hungarian Water Polo Federation.

Honours

As player

National
 Olympic Games:  Gold medal – 2000, 2004, 2008
 World Championships:  Gold medal – 2003;  Silver medal – 1998, 2007;  Bronze medal – 1991
 European Championship:  Gold medal – 1997;  Silver medal – 1993, 1995;  Bronze medal – 2001, 2003, 2008
 FINA World League:  Gold medal – 2003, 2004;  Silver medal – 2007;  Bronze medal – 2002
 FINA World Cup:  Gold medal – 1995;  Silver medal – 1993, 2002;  Bronze medal – 1997

384 present in the national team of Hungary
 Junior World Championships: (Bronze medal – 1991)
 Junior European Championship: (Bronze medal – 1990)
 Youth European Championship: (Gold medal – 1989)

Club
Újpest 
 Hungarian Championship (4x): 1990–91, 1992–93, 1993–94, 1994–95
 Hungarian Cup (2x): 1990–91, 1992–93
 European Cup (1x): 1993–94
 LEN Cup (1x): 1992–93
 LEN Super Cup (1x): 1994

Racing Roma 
  Italian Championship (1x): 1998–99
 LEN Cup Winners' Cup runners-up: 1996–97

Pro Recco
  Italian Championship (1x): 2001–02
 LEN Euroleague (1x): 2002–03

Bp. Honvéd 
 Hungarian Championship (3x): 2004–05, 2005–06
 Hungarian Cup (1x): 2006
 Hungarian Super Cup (1x): 2005

Pro Recco 
  Italian Championship (5x): 2007–08, 2008–09, 2009–10, 2010–11, 2011–12
  Italian Cup (4x): 2007–08, 2008–09, 2009–10, 2010–11
 LEN Champions League (3x): 2007–08, 2009–10, 2011–12
 LEN Super Cup (3x): 2007, 2008, 2010
 Adriatic League (1x): 2011–12

As head coach
 (2013–2016)
 World Championships:  Gold medal – 2013
 European Championship:  Silver medal – 2014;  Bronze medal – 2016
 FINA World League:  Silver medal – 2013, 2014
 FINA World Cup:  Silver medal – 2014

Awards
Total-waterpolo magazine's man water polo "World Player of the Year's2000–20"  award
Member of the Best Team of the Year's in the World by total-waterpolo 2000–20
 Masterly youth athlete: 1991
 Hungarian Water Polo Player of the Year: 1992, 1993, 1994, 2002
 Member of the Hungarian team of year: 1993, 1997, 2000, 2003, 2004, 2008
 Honorary Citizen of Budapest (2008)
 Hungarian head coach of the Year: 2013
 Member of International Swimming Hall of Fame (2016)

Orders
   Officer's Cross of the Order of Merit of the Republic of Hungary (2000)
   Commander's Cross of the Order of Merit of the Republic of Hungary (2004)
   Commander's Cross of the Order of Merit of the Republic of Hungary with the Star (2008)

See also
 Hungary men's Olympic water polo team records and statistics
 List of athletes with the most appearances at Olympic Games
 List of players who have appeared in multiple men's Olympic water polo tournaments
 List of multiple Olympic gold medalists in one event
 List of Olympic champions in men's water polo
 List of Olympic medalists in water polo (men)
 List of men's Olympic water polo tournament top goalscorers
 List of world champions in men's water polo
 List of World Aquatics Championships medalists in water polo
 List of members of the International Swimming Hall of Fame

References

External links
 
 Tibor Benedek at kataca.hu  

1972 births
2020 deaths
Water polo players from Budapest
Hungarian male water polo players
Water polo drivers
Left-handed water polo players
Water polo players at the 1992 Summer Olympics
Water polo players at the 1996 Summer Olympics
Water polo players at the 2000 Summer Olympics
Water polo players at the 2004 Summer Olympics
Water polo players at the 2008 Summer Olympics
Olympic gold medalists for Hungary in water polo
Medalists at the 2000 Summer Olympics
Medalists at the 2004 Summer Olympics
Medalists at the 2008 Summer Olympics
World Aquatics Championships medalists in water polo
Hungarian water polo coaches
Hungary men's national water polo team coaches
Water polo coaches at the 2016 Summer Olympics
Deaths from cancer in Hungary
Deaths from pancreatic cancer
20th-century Hungarian people
21st-century Hungarian people